Sirasa Lakshapathi (Sinhala: සිරස ලක්ෂපති), previously known as Obada Lakshapathi Mamada Lakshapathi (Sinhala: ඔබ ද ලක්ෂපති මම ද ලක්ෂපති), is the one of three Sri Lankan versions for Sinhala-speaking peoples based on the British game show Who Wants to Be a Millionaire?. It was first premiered on September 18, 2010 on Sirasa TV. It was hosted by Lucky Dias and presently hosts by Chandana Suriyabandara.

Lifelines 

 Audience Poll:- If any contestant uses this lifeline, the host will repeat the question to the audience. The studio audience will get 10 seconds to answer the question. Audience members will use touchpads to give the answer what they believe. After the audience will have chosen their choices, their choices will be displayed to the contestant in percentages in bar-graph format and also shown on the monitors screens of the host and contestant, as well as the TV viewers.
 50:50 (Fifty-fifty):- If the contestant will use this lifeline, the host will ask the computer to remove two wrong answers, chosen randomly. This will remain one right answer and one wrong answer. This will help a contestant giving 50% chance of answering the correct answer.
 Phone A Friend:- If the contestant will use this lifeline, the contestant will be allowed to call one of the three pre-arranged friends, who all have to provide their phone numbers in advance. The host will usually be started off by talking to the contestant's friend and introduces him/her to the viewers. After the introduction, the host will hand the phone call over to the contestant, who then immediately have 30 seconds to ask and hope for a reply from their friend.
 Switch the Question:- If any contestant uses this lifeline, the host will remove the whole question and bring a new and fresh one. The computer reveals the answer to the previous question.

Money Tree

18 September 2010-06 June 2021

10 July 2021-present

Winners

Top Prize Winners 

 Apeksha Kumari - Rs. 2,000,000 (February 22, 2013)
 Moksha Madusanka - Rs. 2,000,000 (July 2, 2017)
 Hansini Kavindi - Rs. 2,000,000 (December 8, 2018)
 Shukra Munawwar - Rs. 2,000,000 (January 23, 2021)
 Jude Perera - Rs. 3,000,000 (March 19, 2022)

Penultimate Prize Winners 

 ? - Rs. 1,000,000 (October 23, 2010)
 Nuwan Chathuranga - Rs. 1,000,000 (May 26, 2012)
 Srinath Obeysekara - Rs. 1,000,000 (July 25, 2014)
 Uru Warige Wannila Aththo - Rs. 1,000,000 (November 6, 2016)
 Prasastha Kavishath - Rs. 1,000,000 (May 1, 2021)
 Bryan Kingston - Rs. 2,000,000 (October 23, 2021)

References 

Who Wants to Be a Millionaire?
Television franchises
Sri Lankan television series by genre
Sirasa TV original programming